Harry Harris may refer to:

Harry Harris (boxer) (1880–1959), American boxer
Harry Harris (American football) (1895–1969), American football player
Harry Harris (footballer) (1933–2004), Welsh footballer
Harry Harris (geneticist) (1919–1994), British biochemist and geneticist
Samuel Henry Harris (1881–1936), Australian surgeon
Harry Harris (director) (1922–2009), American television director
Harry B. Harris Jr. (born 1956), admiral in the United States Navy and a US ambassador to South Korea
Harry Harris, character in Uncle Tom's Cabin

See also
Henry Harris (disambiguation)
Harold Harris (disambiguation)